Majhauli Raj is a town and a nagar panchayat in Deoria district in the Indian state of Uttar Pradesh.

The temple of Baba Dirgheswar Nath, a deity of Shiva is nearby. It is believed to have been found and worshipped by Ashwathama, a character in the epic Mahabharata As Well This Village/City is Quite Famous For Khanquah Asadi Muradiya Known as Baba Bhola Shah's Dargaah which is located near of Choti Gandak Nadi.

History
Majhauli Raj was the seat of an eponymous Visen/Bisen Rajput feudal estate known as the Majhauli Raj, which is said to have been founded around 1100 to 1300 CE. King Vishwa Sena (Estimated Around 1000 to 1200 BCE ), one of the sole king of Malla Desh or Malla Bhumi or Malla Rastra (Later known as Malla Mahajanpada), had ruled prior to Mahajanpad Era from Kushinagar as capital of eastern Koshala. Later one of descendant of King Vishwa Sena (i.e.most probably 86th generation) King Bhim Malla went to conquer the pargana of Salempur, Uttar Pradesh and Majhauli, where he founded a fort and established the Majhauli Raj around 1100 to 1300 CE. Main Branch of this dynasty comes from a founder named Mayursharman (also known as Mayur Varman) who has been variously described as a Brahmin/Bhatt. His 8th or 9th Gen. descendant Mayur Bhatta had come from Kashi to Kushinara had children with three wives:  One Brahmin, one Suryavanshi princess of Ayodhya (name may be Suryaprabha), one more Bhumihar. His son from his Bhumihar wife named King Vira Sena (Estimated 1100 CE ) founder of Baghochia Dynasty and his descendants established Bans Gaon Estate (Dileepnagar Estate), Hathwa Raj and Tamkuhi Taj and started Bhumihar branch from him and adopt maternal side title (Malla) and gotra (vats), One son from his Suryavanshi Wife who was princess of Ayodhya whose name was King VishwaSena founder of Vishwasen Rajput dynasty or also called Visen Rajput and his descendant (probably 86th generation) King Bhim Dev stablished Majhuli Raj, One son from his Brahmin wife went on to become the ancestor of the Misra Brahmins; and the son from his Kurmi  went on to found the Salempur estate.

As the kings of Majhauli Raj were descendants of King Vishwasen of Malla Mahajanpad, they stills put this name as a surname i.e. Vishen/Bisen short form of Vishwasen in their names. They are Rishivanshi Suryavanshi BramhaKshatriya Rajputs. Later many kings who were of Majhauli Kingdom established many estates of names Manakpur (Estate), Bhadri ,(Estate),Raja Madhav Mall (Madhuban), Kalakankar (Estate) and many more in north India.

In 1774, the raja of Majhauli, Ajit Mal, openly refused to pay revenue to the amil (collector) in Gorakhpur, crossing over into Bihar whenever the officials attempted to collect payment. He also gave refuge to the Kurmis of Pachlakh, who were openly in arms against the British East India Company. In 1777, Ajit Mal also refused to pay revenues to the British for his lands in Bihar. The British, already beleaguered by the ongoing rebellion of Fateh Sahi of the Huseypur (Hathwa) raj, were initially unwilling to go after Ajit Mal: while they charged Fateh Sahi "guilty of the atrocious crime of premeditated murder and rebellion", they held Ajit Mal guilty of "no offence". When the authorities in Gorakhpur in Oudh State asked for assistance in pursuing Ajit Mal, the British refused. However, when the Gorakhpur authorities offered to join the fight against Fateh Sahi if the British helped them capture Ajit Mal, the British quickly agreed. They were, however, unsuccessful in both measures.

Administration
The town has 13 wards. Local self-government is at the level of Nagar Panchayat and every five years, people elect their representatives for their wards. The tehsil-level administration is located at Salempur. It has its district headquarters at Deoria.

References
2. Reference taken from Books Vishen Vans Vatika by Late Khadaka Bahadur Malla, Vishen Vans Darpan (both not available in web),Genealogy of Malla kings of Majhauli Raj provided by present Royal Family of Majhauli etc.

Cities and towns in Deoria district